

Fossils
 Edward Lhuyd, a Welsh naturalist, speculates that fossils form when the minute spawn of oceanic life is carried inland by air currents and is forced to germinate inside of rocks. He also names Rutellum, a specimen now recognized as a Cetiosaurid Sauropod Dinosaur.

References

17th century in paleontology
Paleontology